The 2015 Mansfield District Council election took place on 7 May 2015 to elect members of Mansfield District Council in England. This was on the same day as other local elections.

Council composition
As of November 2018, there are 17 Mansfield Independent Forum councilors, 17 Labour councillors, 2 Mansfield South Independent and 1 Conservative Party councilor. As such, the Mansfield Independent Forum have a majority of 1 seat on the council.

Overall election results

Mansfield District Council (Summary of overall results)

Results by ward

Abbott

Berry Hill

Brick Kiln

Broomhill

Bull Farm & Pleasley

Carr Bank

Eakring

Grange Farm

Holly

Hornby

Kings Walk

In May 2017, MDC Chairman, Councillor Stephen Harvey joined the Conservative Party and became the only Conservative member of the council

Kingsway

Ladybrook

Lindhurst

Ling Forest

Manor

Market Warsop

Maun Valley

Meden

Netherfield

Newgate

Newlands

Oakham

Oak Tree

Park Hall

Peafields

Penniment

Portland

Racecourse

Ransom Wood

Sandhurst

Sherwood

Warsop Carrs

Woodhouse

Woodlands

Yeoman Hill

Changes between 2015 and 2019

References

2015 English local elections
May 2015 events in the United Kingdom
2015
2010s in Nottinghamshire